The 2010–11 IIHF European Women's Champions Cup was the seventh holding of the IIHF European Women Champions Cup (EWCC). Ilves Tampere Naiset of the Naisten SM-sarja won the tournament for the first time, the first Finnish team to claim the title.

First round

Group A

Group B

Group C

Group D

Second round

Group E

Group F

Final round

References 
Tournament statistics and data from:
"2011 IIHF European Women Champions Cup: Tournament Reports". webarchive.iihf.com. International Ice Hockey Federation. Retrieved 12 November 2020.
"Coupe d'Europe de hockey sur glace féminin 2010/11". hockeyarchives.info (in French). Retrieved 12 November 2020.
”EWCC (W) - 2010-2011”. eliteprospects.com. Retrieved 12 November 2020.

External links
 International Ice Hockey Federation

Women
IIHF European Women's Champions Cup
Euro